Tiso is a genus of sheet weavers first described by Eugène Simon in 1884.

Species
, it contains 8 species:

Tiso aestivus (L. Koch, 1872) – Canada, Greenland, Europe, Russia (Europe to Far East), Nepal, Mongolia, Japan
Tiso biceps Gao, Zhu & Gao, 1993 – China
Tiso camillus Tanasevitch, 1990 – Azerbaijan
Tiso golovatchi Tanasevitch, 2006 – Russia (Far East)
Tiso incisus Tanasevitch, 2011 – India, Pakistan
Tiso indianus Tanasevitch, 2011 – India, Nepal
Tiso megalops Caporiacco, 1935 – Karakorum
Tiso vagans (Blackwall, 1834) (type) – Madeira, Europe. Introduced to Canada

References

Linyphiidae
Araneomorphae genera
Spiders of Asia